Anoplius is a genus of spider wasps in the family Pompilidae, called the blue-black spider wasps.

The genus includes the following species:

Anoplius aethiops (Cresson 1865)
Anoplius americanus (Beauvois)
Anoplius amethystinus (Dahlbom)
Anoplius apiculatus (Smith)
Anoplius atrox (Dahlbom 1843)
Anoplius carolinus (Banks 1921)
Anoplius caviventris (Aurivillius, 1907)
Anoplius cleora (Banks 1917)
Anoplius concinnus (Dahlbom, 1845)
Anoplius depressipes Banks 1919
Anoplius illinoensis (Robertson 1901)
Anoplius infuscatus (Vander Linden, 1827)
Anoplius ithaca (Banks 1912)
Anoplius krombeini Evans 1950
Anoplius marginalis (Banks 1910)
Anoplius marginatus (Say 1824)
Anoplius nigerrimus (Scopoli, 1763)
Anoplius relativus (Fox)
Anoplius samariensis (Pallas, 1771) — species studied for its venom Pompilidotoxin

Anoplius semirufus (Cresson 1867)
Anoplius subcylindricus (Banks 1917)
Anoplius viaticus (Linnaeus, 1758)
Anoplius virginiensis (Cresson 1867)

References

Hymenoptera genera
Pompilinae
Taxa named by Léon Jean Marie Dufour